KJMX (99.5 FM, "The Rock 99.5") is a radio station broadcasting a classic rock music format. Licensed to Reedsport, Oregon, United States, the station is currently owned by Bicoastal Media Licenses III, LLC, and features programming from Westwood One.

References

External links

JMX
Classic rock radio stations in the United States
Douglas County, Oregon
Radio stations established in 1993
1993 establishments in Oregon